Melvin is a city in Osceola County, Iowa, United States. The population was 199 at the time of the 2020 census.

History
Melvin had its start in the year 1900 by the building of the Gowrie branch of the Rock Island Railroad through that territory.

Former location of the famous MARVIN robot, created by Iowa Precision Robotics in 1983. http://cyberneticzoo.com/tag/iowa-precision-robotics-ltd/

Geography
Melvin is located at  (43.286659, -95.607462).

Demographics

2010 census
As of the census of 2010, there were 214 people, 109 households, and 63 families residing in the city. The racial makeup of the city was 97.7% White, 1.4% from other races, and 0.9% from two or more races. Hispanic or Latino of any race were 1.4% of the population.

There were 109 households, of which 18.3% had children under the age of 18 living with them, 45.9% were married couples living together, 8.3% had a female householder with no husband present, 3.7% had a male householder with no wife present, and 42.2% were non-families. 36.7% of all households were made up of individuals, and 12% had someone living alone who was 65 years of age or older. The average household size was 1.96 and the average family size was 2.48.

The median age in the city was 51.1 years. 14.5% of residents were under the age of 18; 7.1% were between the ages of 18 and 24; 17.7% were from 25 to 44; 40.2% were from 45 to 64; and 20.6% were 65 years of age or older. The gender makeup of the city was 48.6% male and 51.4% female.

2000 census
As of the census of 2000, there were 243 people, 117 households, and 67 families residing in the city. The racial makeup of the city was 99.18% White and 0.82% Native American.

There were 117 households, out of which 20.5% had children under the age of 18 living with them, 53.0% were married couples living together, 3.4% had a female householder with no husband present, and 42.7% were non-families. 39.3% of all households were made up of individuals, and 27.4% had someone living alone who was 65 years of age or older. The average household size was 2.08 and the average family size was 2.82.

19.3% are under the age of 18, 4.9% from 18 to 24, 22.2% from 25 to 44, 19.8% from 45 to 64, and 33.7% who were 65 years of age or older. The median age was 47 years. For every 100 females, there were 96.0 males. For every 100 females age 18 and over, there were 84.9 males.

The median income for a household in the city was $27,750, and the median income for a family was $36,250. Males had a median income of $25,250 versus $18,250 for females. The per capita income for the city was $17,827. About 2.9% of families and 8.5% of the population were below the poverty line, including 18.4% of those under the age of eighteen and 7.9% of those 65 or over.

Education
Melvin is served by the Hartley–Melvin–Sanborn Community School District, which formed on July 1, 1991, with the merger of the Hartley–Melvin and Sanborn districts. The predecessor Hartley–Melvin district formed on July 1, 1981, through the merger of the Hartley and Melvin districts.

Currently there are no school facilities in Melvin, not since Hartley and Melvin combined schools in 1980. Hartley–Melvin–Sanborn High School is the zoned high school.

References

Cities in Iowa
Cities in Osceola County, Iowa